Cypress Gardens is a  preserve and gardens located at 3030 Cypress Gardens Road, Moncks Corner, South Carolina, United States. The centerpiece of the garden is the  blackwater bald cypress/tupelo swamp, surrounded with both boat and foot trails.

History
The gardens were originally part of the 1750 Dean Hall rice plantation, which depended on fresh water from the Cooper River. The area that is now a swamp was dug out and fitted with water gates to become a fresh water reservoir. It had fallen into disuse when the property was purchased by Benjamin Kittredge for a duck hunting reserve. It was opened to the public in 1931. Kittredge's son donated the property to the City of Charleston on June 1, 1963. Hurricane Hugo in 1989 severely affected the park, causing it to close for a year. Berkeley County took over ownership when the City of Charleston no longer wanted to support the garden.

In October 2015 historic flooding hit the state of South Carolina that greatly impacted the botanical preserve. On October 13, 2015 it was announced that the attraction would be closed indefinitely following an assessment of millions of dollars of damage. Cypress Gardens officials announced intentions to apply for FEMA assistance with hopes to reopen by the summer of 2016.

April 13th, 2019 Cypress Gardens reopened after nearly four years of being closed. The Grand Opening saw over 3,000 people visit the facilities. Berkeley County Officials announced the park would remain free for Berkeley County residents until June 30, 2019.

Description
Open daily except Thanksgiving, Christmas Eve, Christmas Day, and New Year's Day; an admission fee is charged.

The gardens are viewed via flat-bottom boat or footpaths. Plantings around the swamp include azaleas, blueberries, a camellia garden, daffodils, a daylily island, dogwoods, pitcher plants, redbud, a small rice field, and a rose garden, as well as the following major features:

 Swamparium (1998) – features native and exotic fish, reptile and amphibian species from swamp habitats, including common local venomous snakes and large aquatic salamanders called sirens.
 Aviary – houses African grey parrots and a sulfur-crested cockatoo, former pets.
 Butterfly House (1997) – a  indoor exhibit housing butterflies, birds, koi, goldfish and turtles.

Movies and television
Cypress Gardens has hosted over 16 major movies and television series, including:

 The Patriot 
 Cold Mountain
 The Notebook
 North and South
 Swamp Thing

Gallery

External links 
 Cypress Gardens

References

Botanical gardens in South Carolina
Protected areas of Berkeley County, South Carolina
Swamps of South Carolina
Nature reserves in South Carolina
1932 establishments in South Carolina
Landforms of Berkeley County, South Carolina